In a Silent Way is a studio album by American jazz trumpeter, composer, and bandleader Miles Davis, released on July 30, 1969, on Columbia Records. Produced by Teo Macero, the album was recorded in one session date on February 18, 1969, at CBS 30th Street Studio in New York City. Macero edited and arranged Davis's recordings from the session to produce the album. Marking the beginning of his "electric" period, In a Silent Way has been regarded by music writers as Davis's first fusion recording, following a stylistic shift toward the genre in his previous records and live performances.

Upon its release, the album was met by controversy among music critics, particularly those of jazz and rock music, who were divided in their reaction to its experimental musical structure and Davis's electric approach. Since its initial reception, it has been regarded by fans and critics as one of Davis's greatest and most influential works. In 2001, Columbia Legacy and Sony Music released the three-disc box set The Complete In a Silent Way Sessions, which includes additional tracks.

Background and recording 
By January 1969, Davis' core working band had stabilised around Wayne Shorter on soprano saxophone, Dave Holland on bass, Chick Corea on electric piano, and Jack DeJohnette on drums. For his next studio album, Davis brought in former band members Tony Williams on drums as he wished to use his style and Herbie Hancock on additional electric piano as they had previously agreed to work with Davis on studio recordings. In the following month, the six were joined by Austrian keyboardist Josef Zawinul after Davis had called him and asked to bring musical ideas for the group, and English guitarist John McLaughlin, who had been in the United States for less than two weeks to join The Tony Williams Lifetime before Davis asked him to attend the recording session. McLaughlin had been a longtime fan of Davis, and spoke of his nervousness to the trumpeter about the prospect of recording with his idol. Among the pieces by Zawinul that Davis took a liking to was "In a Silent Way", an atmospheric piece that was titled at the suggestion of Julian "Cannonball" Adderley when the two were in the same band. Adderley wished to use the piece for his own recording but Zawinul turned him down after he learned that Davis wished to use it.

Although Davis' live performances and recent albums Miles in the Sky (1968) and Filles de Kilimanjaro (1968) had indicated his stylistic shift towards electric instruments and jazz fusion, In a Silent Way featured a full-blown electric approach by Davis. It has been regarded by music writers as the first of Davis's fusion recordings, while marking the beginning of his "electric" period. It is also the first recording by Davis that was largely constructed by the editing and arrangement of producer Teo Macero, whose editing techniques have incorporated elements of classical sonata form in Davis' recordings for In a Silent Way. Both tracks on the album consist of three distinct parts that could be thought of as an exposition, development, and recapitulation, with the first and last third of each track being the same piece.

In a Silent Way was assembled from takes from a three-hour session from Studio B at CBS 30th Street Studio in New York City, on February 18, 1969. "Shhh/Peaceful" was composed solely by Davis, while the opening and closing section to "In a Silent Way/It's About That Time" is based on Zawinul's "In a Silent Way" which he would record in its original form in 1970 for his third solo album Zawinul (1971). After Zawinul presented the tune to the group, it was rehearsed as it was originally written, but Davis wished for it to sound more rock-oriented and stripped the various chord changes to leave a more basic melody, allowing the band to play around it from a single pedal point. McLaughlin had some difficulty playing in the manner Davis wished of him, but found his way after the trumpeter suggested he play the guitar as if he were a novice. Davis maintained the belief that Zawinul was never happy with his adaptation and believed the album would have been less successful had its original arrangement been kept. Zawinul had expressed some irritation towards the rearrangement, in particular of two chords that he believed Davis was wrong to remove as the piece lacked a greater climax than it could have had if they were retained. Zawinul claimed he was responsible for the melodic bass line and descending melody to "It's About That Time" but was not credited. He blamed Macero for this as he "always put things together so that it came out as if Miles had written it. But that's not correct".

Two days after the February 18 session, Davis returned to the studio and put down "Ghetto Walk" with drummer Joe Chambers which he intended to include on In a Silent Way with "Shhh/Peaceful" but it was later swapped for "In a Silent Way/It's About That Time". The group also played through "Early Minor", another Zawinul piece, on the day but eventually scrapped it.

Release

The album was originally released on July 30, 1969.

In 2001, Columbia Legacy and Sony Music released the three-disc box set The Complete In a Silent Way Sessions, which includes the original album, additional tracks, and the unedited recordings utilized for production purposes.

In 2002, Sony Music released a 5.1 surround sound mix, produced by Bob Belden and engineered by Mark Wilder.

Reception

Peaking at number 134 on the U.S. Billboard Top LPs chart, In a Silent Way became Davis's first album since 1965's My Funny Valentine to reach the chart. While it performed better commercially than most of Davis's previous work, the album's critics were divided in their reaction upon its release. Its incorporation of electric instrumentation and experimental structure have been sources of extreme controversy among jazz critics. According to The Rolling Stone Album Guide (1992), Davis's recording process and producer Teo Macero's studio editing of individual recordings into separate tracks for the album "seemed near heretical by jazz standards". In his book Running the Voodoo Down: The Electric Music of Miles Davis, Phil Freeman writes that rock and jazz critics at the time of the album's release were biased in their respective genres, writing "Rock critics thought In a Silent Way sounded like rock, or at least thought Miles was nodding in their direction, and practically wet themselves with joy. Jazz critics, especially ones who didn't listen to much rock, thought it sounded like rock too, and they reacted less favorably". Freeman continues by expressing that both reactions were "rooted, at least partly, in the critic's paranoia about his place in the world", writing that rock criticism was in its early stage of existence and such critics found "reassurance" in viewing the album as having psychedelic rock elements, while jazz critics felt "betrayed" amid the genre's decreasing popularity at the time.

In a rave review, Rolling Stone writer Lester Bangs described In a Silent Way as "the kind of album that gives you faith in the future of music. It is not rock and roll, but it's nothing stereotyped as jazz either. All at once, it owes almost as much to the techniques developed by rock improvisors in the last four years as to Davis' jazz background. It is part of a transcendental new music which flushes categories away and, while using musical devices from all styles and cultures, is defined mainly by its deep emotion and unaffected originality". Davis' next fusion album, Bitches Brew, showed him moving even further into the area that lay between the genres of rock and jazz. The dark, fractured dissonance of Bitches Brew ultimately proved to be instrumental in its success; it far outsold In a Silent Way.

In a Silent Way has been regarded by fans and critics as one of Davis's best works. In a retrospective review, Blender writer K. Leander Williams called it "a proto-ambient masterpiece". Citing it as "one of Davis’s greatest achievements", Chip O'Brien of PopMatters viewed that producer Teo Macero's studio editing on the album helped Davis "embrace the marriage of music and technology". In regards to its musical significance, O'Brien wrote that In a Silent Way "transcends labels", writing "It is neither jazz nor rock. It isn’t what will eventually become known as fusion, either. It is something altogether different, something universal. There is a beautiful resignation in the sounds of this album, as if Davis is willingly letting go of what has come before, of his early years with Charlie Parker, with John Coltrane and Cannonball Adderley, of his early ‘60s work, and is embracing the future, not only of jazz, but of music itself". Stylus Magazine writer Nick Southall called the album "timeless" and wrote of its influence on music, stating "The fresh modes of constructing music that it presented revolutionised the jazz community, and the shifting, ethereal beauty of the actual music contained within has remained beautiful and wonderful, its echoes heard through the last 30 years, touching dance music, electronica, rock, pop, all music". The Penguin Guide to Jazz has included In a Silent Way in its suggested "Core Collection".  The album was also included in the book 1001 Albums You Must Hear Before You Die.

Track listing 

 "Shhh" – 6:14
 "Peaceful" – 5:42
 "Shhh" – 6:20

 "In a Silent Way" – 4:11
 "It's About That Time" – 11:27
 "In a Silent Way" – 4:14

Charts

Personnel 
Credits are adapted from the album's 1969 liner notes.

Musicians 
 Miles Davis – trumpet
 Wayne Shorter – soprano saxophone 
 John McLaughlin – electric guitar
 Chick Corea – electric piano
 Herbie Hancock – electric piano
 Joe Zawinul – electric piano, organ
 Dave Holland – double bass
 Tony Williams – drums

Production 
Teo Macero – producer 
Stan Tonkel – engineer
Russ Payne – engineer
Lee Friedlander – cover photo
John G. Walter – back cover photography
Frank Glenn – back cover notes

References 
Citations

Books
 Carr, Ian. Miles Davis: The Definitive Biography. Thunder's Mouth Press, New York, 1998.
 Tingen, Paul. Miles Beyond: The Electric Explorations of Miles Davis, 1967–1991. Billboard Books, New York, 2001. Miles Beyond

External links 
 
 "Jazz Annual: Miles Davis/Tony Williams" by Robert Christgau
 "Electric Miles: A Look at the In a Silent Way and On the Corner Sessions" by Victor Svorinich

1969 albums
Albums produced by Teo Macero
Albums recorded at CBS 30th Street Studio
Avant-garde jazz albums
Columbia Records albums
Grammy Hall of Fame Award recipients
Jazz fusion albums by American artists
Miles Davis albums
Instrumental albums